Mariette Pathy Allen (Alexandria, 1940) is a photographer for the transgender, genderfluid, and intersex communities and a writer. She has published five books, Transformations: Cross-dressers and Those Who Love Them (1989), Masked Culture: The Greenwich Village Halloween Parade (1994), The Gender Frontier (2004), TransCuba (2014) and Transcendents: Spirit Mediums in Burma and Thailand (2017). She is an activist for gender consciousness and reflects positivity towards underrepresented communities.

Early life and education  

Allen was born in Egypt to a wealthy Hungarian family who were involved in the shipping industry. Her first cousin once removed is Mark Pathy.

Allen graduated from Vassar College and then attended the Graduate School of Fine Arts at the University of Pennsylvania where she received an MFA in Fine Arts and Painting. She took a photography class off campus and switched her focus from painting to photography.

Her background in painting has influenced her photographic work as she has used it to explore "color, space, and cultural juxtapositions".

Career 
She discovered that photography was like a passport into the world. This transition gave her the opportunity to meet new people while traveling all over the world. Ultimately, this sparked her career as a photographer where she photographed the transgender community for over 20 years.

In 1978, Allen was staying in the same hotel with a group of cross-dressers celebrating Mardi Gras and was inspired to be begin photographing the intimate and often secretive lives of cross-dressers and transgender individuals. She grew into photojournalism and advocacy for the emergent transgender rights movement in the 1990s. She aims to photograph misunderstood communities in the "daylight of everyday life" and capture humanity with their families, in their careers, at their homes.

Allen wrote Transformations: Crossdressers and Those Who Love Them in 1989. This book depicts the lives of heterosexual, married men who cross dress. She includes black and white portrait and interviews of her subjects.

In her second book The Gender Frontier (2003), Allen documents the transgender community through political movements and public demonstrations. In 2005, the book was awarded the Lambda Literary Award in the transgender category.

Allen has contributed her work to magazines, books, photography exhibitions and documentaries all over the world. Allen's career highlights include being the photographer for Lee Grant's 1984 documentary What Sex Am I?, Southern Comfort (2001), and Rosa von Praunheim's The Transsexual Menace. Allen took the cover photo of Jamison Green's Becoming a Visible Man. She was an associate producer for an A&E documentary The Transgender Revolution (1998). Her photography has been exhibited in the permanent collection at the Bibliothèque nationale de France, the Corcoran Gallery of Art in Washington D.C., the Brooklyn Museum of Art, Houston's Museum of Fine Arts, and the New York Public Library. Allen is unofficially referred to as the "official photographer of the transgender community."

Allen's life's work is being archived by the Duke University Library Archive of Documentary Arts.

References 

American LGBT rights activists
Vassar College alumni
University of Pennsylvania School of Design alumni
American photographers
1940 births
Living people
Lambda Literary Award winners
Egyptian emigrants to the United States
American women photographers
Genderfluid people